Grip was a satirical magazine published in Toronto by John Wilson Bengough between 1873 and 1894.

Grips first issue was released on May 24, 1873. The magazine's title was taken from the name of a raven in Barnaby Rudge, a novel by Charles Dickens. Its weekly circulation peaked at approximately 7,000 copies per week. Ramsay Cook argues that the magazine first entered mainstream consciousness during the Pacific Scandal.

Bengough took inspiration from the cartoons of Thomas Nast, particularly those mocking William M. Tweed, a Tammany Hall boss, that appeared in Harper's Weekly. Cumming argues that Grip was strongly influenced by Punch, a British magazine of political satire.

Mendelson suggests that Grips political line was strongly influenced by the political economy of Henry George, who argued for free trade and a single land tax. Mendelson also points out that the publication espoused racist, antisemitic, and nativist views by perpetuating stereotypical portrayals of Black and Jewish people, non-white immigrants, and others. Grip generally had Grit leanings.

Thomas Phillips Thompson became Grips editor in 1892 after Bengough was removed.

References

Sources

Further reading

External links 
 
 Grip issues online via Canadiana.org

1873 establishments in Ontario
1894 disestablishments in Ontario
Defunct magazines published in Canada